Push Comes to Shove may refer to:

Push Comes to Shove (album), a 1994 album by Jackyl
Push Comes to Shove, a rock song by Van Halen for their 1981 album Fair Warning
Push Comes to Shove, an animated short film by Bill Plympton
Push Comes to Shove, the title of both a book and a ballet by Twyla Tharp
 "Push Comes To Shove", a song by Aerosmith from Rock in a Hard Place